Vilkij-e Markazi Rural District is in Vilkij District of Namin County, Ardabil province, Iran. At the census of 2006, its population was 14,469 in 2,952 households; there were 14,562 inhabitants in 3,930 households at the following census of 2011; and in the most recent census of 2016, the population of the rural district was 14,513 in 4,119 households. The largest of its 20 villages was Suha, with 1,958 people.

References 

Namin County

Rural Districts of Ardabil Province

Populated places in Ardabil Province

Populated places in Namin County